The 1952 World Fencing Championships were held in Copenhagen, Denmark. The championships were for non-Olympic events only.

Medal table

Women's events

References

1952 in Danish sport
1952 in fencing
F
International sports competitions in Copenhagen
World Fencing Championships
Fencing competitions in Denmark
1950s in Copenhagen